Merritt Park is a census-designated place (CDP) in the town of Fishkill in Dutchess County, New York, United States. As of the 2010 census it had a population of 1,256.

The CDP is located in the eastern part of the town of Fishkill in southwestern Dutchess County. It is bordered to the west by the village of Fishkill, to the north by Fishkill Creek, to the southeast by  Honness Mountain, and to the northeast by New York State Route 52. Merritt Boulevard is the main thoroughfare through the community, connecting NY 52 to the northeast with U.S. Route 9 in the southern part of Fishkill village.

Geography

Demographics

References

Geography of Dutchess County, New York
Census-designated places in New York (state)
Hamlets in New York (state)